The John F. Dumke and Lillia or John F. and Lillia Dumke House, at 1607 Kiesel Ave. in Ogden, Utah, was built in 1920.  It was listed on the National Register of Historic Places in 2007.

It is a Craftsman-style bungalow.

References

American Craftsman architecture in Utah
National Register of Historic Places in Weber County, Utah
Houses completed in 1920